Jackson Township is one of the twelve townships of Champaign County, Ohio, United States. The 2010 census reported 2,644 people living in the township, and 1,904 of whom were in the unincorporated portions of the township.

Geography
Located in the southwestern corner of the county, it borders the following townships:
Johnson Township - north
Mad River Township - east
German Township, Clark County - southeast corner
Pike Township, Clark County - south
Elizabeth Township, Miami County - southwest corner
Lostcreek Township, Miami County - west
Brown Township, Miami County - northwest

Two villages are located in Jackson Township: Christiansburg in the southwest, and part of St. Paris in the north.  The unincorporated community of Thackery lies in the township's southeast.

Name and history
Jackson Township is named for Andrew Jackson. It is one of thirty-seven Jackson Townships statewide.

Government
The township is governed by a three-member board of trustees, who are elected in November of odd-numbered years to a four-year term beginning on the following January 1. Two are elected in the year after the presidential election and one is elected in the year before it. There is also an elected township fiscal officer, who serves a four-year term beginning on April 1 of the year after the election, which is held in November of the year before the presidential election. Vacancies in the fiscal officership or on the board of trustees are filled by the remaining trustees.

References

External links
County website
County and township map of Ohio

Townships in Champaign County, Ohio
Townships in Ohio